Louise Hammond Raymond (née Hammond; December 29, 1886 – August 3, 1991) was an American tennis player.

Career
She reached the women's singles final of the 1910 U.S. National Championships which she lost to compatriot Hazel Hotchkiss Wightman in straight sets. She again reached the women's singles final in 1916 and this time was defeated by the Norwegian Molla Bjurstedt 0–6, 1–6 in 22 minutes. This was the shortest Grand Slam final in history.

In 1909 she reached the finals of the women's doubles at the U.S. Indoor Championships.

In 1908 and 1909 she reached the mixed doubles finals at the U.S. National Championships together with Raymond Little.

In 1910 she won the Middle States Championship after defeating Mrs. G. L. Chapman in the final round and the default of Carrie Neely in the challenge round.

In 1914 she won the Middle States Championships (Montrose, New Jersey) at the Orange Lawn Tennis Club by defeating title holder Edith Rotch in the challenge round in straight sets.

Grand Slam finals

Singles (2 runners-up)

Doubles (2 runners-up)

Mixed doubles (2 runners-up)

References

19th-century American women
American female tennis players
1886 births
1991 deaths
Date of death missing
Sportspeople from New York City
Tennis people from New York (state)
American centenarians
Women centenarians